Yamile (pronounced sha-MEE-lay) Saied Méndez is an Argentine American author of picture books, children's books, young adult books, and adult romance. She is a Pura Belpré gold medal winner for her young adult novel, Furia. She is a founding member of Las Musas collective.

Background 
Méndez was born in Rosario, Argentina. Méndez grew up attached to the culture of one grandfather, who was Syrian Lebanese; her mother was an orphan but knew she was a descendant of indigenous people from Argentina. Her father drove a taxi and her mother worked as a nanny. The first among her extended family members to attend college, she went to Brigham Young University where she studied international economics. Méndez received an MFA from Vermont College of Fine Arts. Méndez lives in Utah with her husband and five children.

Awards and recognition 
 Walter Dean Myers grant to write Furia (2015) 
New York Public Library Best Books of 2019 for "¿De Dónde Eres?" 
Kirkus Best Books of 2019
2020 Children's and Young Adult Bloggers' Literary Awards (Cybils) for Furia
Reese's YA Book Club selection for Furia (2020) 
 Winner of a Pura Belpré YA Author Medal for Furia (2021)

Articles 
 The Pen Ten: An Interview with Yamile Saied Méndez
 Yamile Saied Méndez talks FURIA and the Argentina soccer scene
 This Utah author has a new novel — and Reese Witherspoon just chose it for her book club

Bibliography 
Blizzard Besties (2018)
“Where Are You From?” /"¿De Dónde Eres?" (2019)
Random Acts of Kittens (2019)
On These Magic Shores (2020)
Furia (2020)
Shaking Up the House (2021)
What Will You Be? (2021)
Wish Upon a Stray (2021)
Can't Be Tamed (2022)
Friends Like These (2022)
Where There's Smoke (2022)
Our Shadows Have Claws (2022)
Twice a Quinceañera (2022)

References

External links 

 Official website

American women children's writers
American children's writers
American writers of young adult literature
Argentine women children's writers
Argentine writers of young adult literature
Living people
Women writers of young adult literature
Year of birth missing (living people)
21st-century American women